Anthony Mills (12 February 1920 – 22 May 1997) was an English cricketer. He played for Gloucestershire between 1939 and 1948.

References

External links

1920 births
1997 deaths
English cricketers
Gloucestershire cricketers
Wiltshire cricketers
People from Wiltshire